Emmbrook may refer to:

Emmbrook, Berkshire, a suburb of the town of Wokingham, Berkshire, England
Emm Brook, a river in Berkshire, England
Emmbrook School, the secondary school in the area of Wokingham